Koy Sanjaq District is a district in Kurdistan Region, Iraq. The district encompass five Sub-Districts Shorash, Ashti, Segrdkan and Taqtaq, it is neighbored from east and south by the Little Zab river, which separates it from Governorate of Kirkuk and Suleimaniyah, and is bordered to the north east of Mount Haibat Sultan and embraced by the west of Mount Bawage

References

Districts of Erbil Governorate
Erbil Governorate
Koy Sanjaq